Lee Beachill (born 28 November 1977 in Huddersfield, United Kingdom) is a former World No. 1 squash player from England.

Beachill reached the World No. 1 ranking in October 2004. He also finished runner-up at the World Open that year.

Beachill was part of the English team which won the World Team Squash Championships in 2005. He has also won gold medals for England in the men's doubles at the Commonwealth Games in 2002 and 2006, partnering Peter Nicol on both occasions.

Beachill has won the British National Squash Championships three times – in 2001, 2002 and 2005.

Beachill announced his retirement from the game in February 2009 after undergoing hernia surgery.

As a junior player, Beachill helped England win the World Junior Team Championship in 1997, and was the British champion at under-12, under-14, under-17 and under-19 levels.

Lee first played the game at the Skelmanthorpe Squash Club in Yorkshire under the guidance of coach Chris Beck.

He attended Horbury School, Horbury.

World Open final appearances

0 title and 1 runner-up

Major World Series final appearances

Qatar Classic: 1 final (1 title, 0 runner-up)

US Open: 2 finals (2 titles, 0 runner-up)

References

External links
 
 
 
 
 
 

1977 births
Living people
English male squash players
Commonwealth Games gold medallists for England
Commonwealth Games bronze medallists for England
Commonwealth Games medallists in squash
Squash players at the 2002 Commonwealth Games
Squash players at the 2006 Commonwealth Games
Sportspeople from Huddersfield
Sportspeople from Pontefract
Medallists at the 2002 Commonwealth Games
Medallists at the 2006 Commonwealth Games